Gierbach is a river of Hesse, Germany. It flows into the Nidda in Rainrod.

See also
List of rivers of Hesse

References

Rivers of Hesse
Rivers of the Vogelsberg
Rivers of Germany